Raleigh Webb (born December 28, 1997) is an American football wide receiver for the New England Patriots of the National Football League (NFL). He played college football at The Citadel.

Early life and high school
Webb grew up in Acworth, Georgia and attended Allatoona High School. As a senior, he made 117 tackles, 4.0 for loss, four interceptions, and two forced fumbles as Allatoona won the Georgia AAAAA state championship.

College career
Webb redshirted his true freshman season at The Citadel and practiced as a defensive back. He was moved wide receiver prior to the start of his redshirt freshman season. Webb was named first team All-Southern Conference after catching 30 passes for 617 yards and 10 touchdowns as a redshirt sophomore. He caught 17 passes
for 282 yards and four touchdowns in 12 games during his redshirt senior season, which was played both in the fall of 2020 and the spring of 2021 due to the COVID-19 pandemic.

Webb decided to utilize the extra year of eligibility granted to college athletes who played in the 2020 season due to the coronavirus pandemic and return to The Citadel for a sixth season. He finished his final season with 25 receptions for 536 yards and three touchdowns and also rushed for two touchdowns. Webb finished his collegiate career with 102 receptions for 2,151 receiving yards and 22 touchdowns. Webb also ran track at The Citadel.

Professional career

Baltimore Ravens
Webb signed with the Baltimore Ravens as an undrafted free agent on May 7, 2022. He was waived during final roster cuts on August 30, 2022, but was signed to the team's practice squad the next day. Webb was elevated to the active roster on September 18, 2022, for the team's Week 2 game against the Miami Dolphins and made his NFL debut in the game. Webb was elevated again for the Ravens' Week 3 game against the New England Patriots.

New England Patriots
The New England Patriots signed Webb to their active roster from the Ravens' practice squad on October 19, 2022.

References

External links
The Citadel Bulldogs bio
Baltimore Ravens bio

Living people
American football wide receivers
Players of American football from Georgia (U.S. state)
The Citadel Bulldogs football players
The Citadel Bulldogs men's track and field athletes
Baltimore Ravens players
New England Patriots players
1997 births